Antonio Di Martino (born 1 December 1982), known professionally as Dimartino, is an Italian singer-songwriter.

He participated at Sanremo Music Festival 2021 with the song "Musica leggerissima", together with Colapesce. He took part at Sanremo Music Festival 2023, once again alongside Colapesce, with the song "Splash", winning the Mia Martini critics award.

Discography

Studio albums 
 Cara maestra abbiamo perso (2010)
 Sarebbe bello non lasciarsi mai, ma abbandonarsi ogni tanto è utile (2012)
 Un paese ci vuole (2015)
 Un mondo raro (2017) with Fabrizio Cammarata (singer)
 Afrodite (2019)
 I mortali (2020) with Colapesce

Extended plays 
 Non vengo più mamma (2013)

References

External links

Italian  male singer-songwriters
Living people
21st-century Italian  male  singers
1982 births
People from Palermo